Reinwardtia indica, yellow flax or pyoli, is a species of Linaceae found in the Himalayas. It is the only species in the monotypic genus Reinwardtia.

Distribution
This flower comes from Himalayas in both China and northern India.

Uses
A yellow dye made from the flowers is used for dyeing clothes and making paints.

Culture

Pyoli is the subject of many folk songs.

According to Garhwali and Kumaoni folklore, Pyoli was a young maiden living in the forest. She was raised by animals and her first human contact was in the form of a prince who had lost his way during a hunting expedition. She tended after him and of course he fell in love with her. He persuaded her to marry him and accompany him to his palace. Although she loved the prince she started wilting away in the absence of a natural environment. No one could cure her and finally she died pining for her flora and fauna friends. Her last wish was that she should be buried among her friends. The prince took her to be buried at the place he had first met her. Some time later a pretty, yellow flower came out at the spot. This flower was named after the pretty nature-loving belle.

Taxonomy
The following are taxonomic synonyms for Reinwardtia indica:

R. tetragyna, R. trigyna, Linum trigynum, Linum cicanobum, Linum repens, Kittelocharis trigyna, Macrolium trigynum

References

 "Tales and legends from India" (page 13) by Iris Macfarlane (1966)
Legends of the gods: strange and fascinating tales from around the world (page 33) by Noreen Shelley (1976),

External links
Reinwardtia trigyna (Roxb.) Planch., Flora of Pakistan

Indian folklore
Linaceae
Monotypic Malpighiales genera
Flora of China
Flora of the Indian subcontinent